Józef Bronisław Stogowski (27 November 1899 – 14 May 1940) was a Polish ice hockey goaltender. He played for TKS Toruń, Legia Warsaw, and AZS Poznań during his hockey career. He also played for the Polish national ice hockey team at the 1928, 1932, and 1936 Winter Olympics. At the 1932 Winter Olympics he was Poland's flag bearer. He helped Poland win silver at the 1929 European Championship. Two years later at the 1931 World Championship, which concurrently served as the European Championship, Stogowski helped Poland again win silver.

References

External links
 

1899 births
1940 deaths
Ice hockey players at the 1928 Winter Olympics
Ice hockey players at the 1932 Winter Olympics
Ice hockey players at the 1936 Winter Olympics
Legia Warsaw (ice hockey) players
Olympic ice hockey players of Poland
Polish ice hockey goaltenders
Polish people of the Polish–Soviet War
Sportspeople from Toruń